Rudolf Kaltenbach (12 May 1842 – 21 November 1893) was a German gynecologist who was a native of Freiburg im Breisgau.

In 1865 he earned his medical doctorate from the University of Vienna, and afterwards trained under Johann von Dumreicher (1815-1880) at the surgical hospital in Vienna. From 1867 to 1873 he was an assistant to Alfred Hegar (1830–1914) in Freiburg, and was later a professor of gynecology and obstetrics at the University of Giessen. In 1887 he became an OB/GYN professor at Halle, where he succeeded Robert Michaelis von Olshausen (1835–1915). Kaltenbach served in the military during the Austro-Prussian (on the Austrian side) and Franco-Prussian Wars.

Kaltenbach is remembered for his numerous medical publications, including a book on operative gynecology that he co-authored with Alfred Hegar. He is credited with introducing a gynecological graphic aid involving menstruation cycles called the Kaltenbachschema (Kaltenbach chart).

Selected writings 
 Operative Gynäkologie (with Alfred Hegar) 1874 – operative gynaecology
 Lehrbuch der Geburtshilfe, Stuttgart 1893 – textbook of obstetrics

References 
 Parts of this article are based on a translation of an eqyuivalent article at the German Wikipedia.

 The Kaltenbach Chart

1842 births
1893 deaths
German gynaecologists
German obstetricians
Physicians from Freiburg im Breisgau
People from the Grand Duchy of Baden
People of the Austro-Prussian War
German military personnel of the Franco-Prussian War
University of Vienna alumni
Academic staff of the University of Giessen
Academic staff of the Martin Luther University of Halle-Wittenberg